Velibor Pudar (born 22 November 1964) is a Bosnian football manager and former goalkeeper.

Playing career
Born in Mostar, SR Bosnia and Herzegovina of Serb parents, he played with FK Lokomotiva Mostar from where he moved to FK Velež Mostar in summer 1987. He played with Velež  between 1987 and 1992 in the Yugoslav First League. With the beginning of the war, he moved abroad where he played one season with Apollon Smyrni F.C. in the Greek top league. After that season, he moved to FR Yugoslavia where he played with Montenegrin club FK Sutjeska Nikšić in the First League, and with several other clubs in other leagues, namely, Serbian clubs FK Čukarički, FK Jedinstvo Paraćin and FK Palilulac Beograd. By the end of the 1990s he also played in Sweden with Vasalunds IF and in Finland with TPV Tampere before returning to Bosnia and Herzegovina to play with FK Leotar finishing his career as a coach and player of FK Velež Mostar in 2005.

Managerial career
It was in 2005 that Pudar obtained the level A UEFA licence for coaching, after graduating in Belgrade's Higher School for Football. After early coaching experiences while still playing with FK Leotar and FK Velež Mostar, he also coached NK Bratstvo Gračanica in the 2008–2009 season. In the 2009–2010 season coached FK Igman Konjic, 2010–2015 coached Ittihad FC and in 2015–2016 he coached Al-Taawoun FC.

Personal life
Velibor is the father of swimmer Lana Pudar, who competed at the 2020 Summer Olympics and who claimed the gold medal in the women’s 200-metre butterfly at the 2022 European Aquatics Championships in Rome, Italy.

References

External links
Player profile at gamma.ba.

1964 births
Living people
Sportspeople from Mostar
Serbs of Bosnia and Herzegovina
Association football goalkeepers
Yugoslav footballers
Bosnia and Herzegovina footballers
FK Velež Mostar players
Apollon Smyrnis F.C. players
FK Čukarički players
FK Sutjeska Nikšić players
FK Palilulac Beograd players
Vasalunds IF players
Tampereen Pallo-Veikot players
FK Leotar players
Yugoslav First League players
Super League Greece players
First League of Serbia and Montenegro players
Second League of Serbia and Montenegro players
Veikkausliiga players
Bosnia and Herzegovina expatriate footballers
Expatriate footballers in Greece
Bosnia and Herzegovina expatriate sportspeople in Greece
Expatriate footballers in Serbia and Montenegro
Bosnia and Herzegovina expatriate sportspeople in Serbia and Montenegro
Expatriate footballers in Sweden
Bosnia and Herzegovina expatriate sportspeople in Sweden
Expatriate footballers in Finland
Bosnia and Herzegovina expatriate sportspeople in Finland
Bosnia and Herzegovina football managers
FK Velež Mostar managers
NK Bratstvo Gračanica managers
FK Igman Konjic managers
Ittihad FC managers
Al-Taawoun FC managers
Bosnia and Herzegovina expatriate football managers
Expatriate football managers in Saudi Arabia
Bosnia and Herzegovina expatriate sportspeople in Saudi Arabia